New Hampshire's 15th State Senate district is one of 24 districts in the New Hampshire Senate. It has  been represented by Democrat Becky Whitley since 2020, when fellow Democrat Dan Feltes stepped down to run for governor.

Geography
District 15 is based in the state capital of Concord, also covering the Merrimack County towns of Bow and Hopkinton

The district is located entirely within New Hampshire's 2nd congressional district.

Federal and statewide results in District 15
Results are of elections held under 2022 district lines.

Recent election results

2022

Historical election results
The following result occurred prior to 2022 redistricting, and thus were held under different district lines.

2020

2018

2016

2014

2012

2010

References

15
Merrimack County, New Hampshire